The 1968 Purdue Boilermakers football team represented Purdue University during the 1968 Big Ten Conference football season. Led by 13th-year head coach Jack Mollenkopf, the Boilermakers compiled an overall record of 8–2 with a mark of 5–2 in conference play, tying for third place in the Big Ten. Purdue played home games at Ross–Ade Stadium in West Lafayette, Indiana.

Schedule

Roster

Game summaries

Wake Forest
 Leroy Keyes 25 rushes, 214 yards

Indiana
 Leroy Keyes 28 rushes, 140 yards

References

Purdue
Purdue Boilermakers football seasons
Purdue Boilermakers football